The Metropolitan Savings Bank Building opened on May 30, 1867 at the northeast corner of Third Avenue and East 7th Street, in Manhattan, New York City. Its original address was 10 Cooper Institute (now 61 Cooper Square). Its facades were composed of white marble, with the upper floor being enclosed by a mansard roof. The building was fireproof, as no combustible materials were used during construction, either internally or externally. The entire cost of the structure was $150,000.

The Metropolitan Savings Bank was chartered in New York in 1852. In 1935 the bank moved its headquarters from Cooper Square to 754 Broadway. In 1942, it merged with the Manhattan Savings Institution (foudned 1852) and the Citizens Savings Bank to form the Manhattan Savings Bank. In 1990, Edmund Safra's Republic National Bank bought the Manhattan Savings Bank, and was in turn purchased by HSBC in 1999.

The building was designated a New York City Landmark in 1969, and was added to the National Register of Historic Place in 1979.

Interior design
Its acoustic properties were excellent.

Black walnut was used inside for building desks, chairs, and stairways. The office furniture evoked a simple design and reflected excellent taste The President's room, located behind the banking house proper, was less spacious, as offices were given the maximum space. Another feature of the interior was its immense safe.

Lessees
The fireproof construction of the Metropolitan Savings Bank enabled the rapid renting of any free space not used by the bank. The basement and cellar beneath it was leased for ten years to the Stuyvesant Safe Deposit Company.  The floor just above the bank was leased by the United States Assessor of Internal Revenue. The third floor, unlet when the building first opened, was rented for a decade by the Eastern Star Lodge of Freemasons.

Later uses
In 1937, the building was sold to the First Ukrainian Assembly of God, and it has been used since that time as a church, most recently by the First Ukrainian Evangelical Pentecostal Church.

References
Notes

External links

Third Avenue
East Village, Manhattan
Metropolitan Savings Bank
Buildings and structures on the National Register of Historic Places in Manhattan
New York City Designated Landmarks in Manhattan
Buildings with mansard roofs
1867 establishments in New York (state)